College Hill is an unincorporated community located in Madison County, Kentucky, United States. Its post office  is closed. It was also known as Texas. It is located on Kentucky Route 977 north of Waco.

The Cane Springs Primitive Baptist Church on the National Register of Historic Places is located within the community.

References

Unincorporated communities in Madison County, Kentucky
Unincorporated communities in Kentucky